Penruddock railway station was situated on the Cockermouth, Keswick and Penrith Railway between Penrith and Cockermouth in Cumberland (now in Cumbria), England. The station served the villages of Penruddock and Motherby. The station opened to passenger traffic on 2 January 1865, and closed on 6 March 1972.

References

Sources

External links

Disused railway stations in Cumbria
Former Cockermouth, Keswick and Penrith Railway stations
Railway stations in Great Britain opened in 1865
Railway stations in Great Britain closed in 1972
Beeching closures in England
Hutton, Cumbria